Frank Fellows may refer to:

 Frank Fellows (basketball), head coach of the Maryland Terrapins men's basketball
 Frank Fellows (politician) (1889–1951), U.S. Representative from Maine